Norway Fund may refer to:

 Norwegian State Educational Loan Fund
 The Government Pension Fund of Norway
 Norwegian Public Service Pension Fund
 Innovation Norway (Norwegian Industrial and Regional Development Fund)
 The Development Fund (Utviklingsfondet)